432 Park Avenue is a residential skyscraper at 57th Street and Park Avenue in Midtown Manhattan in New York City, overlooking Central Park. The  tower was developed by CIM Group and Harry B. Macklowe and designed by Rafael Viñoly. A part of Billionaires' Row, 432 Park Avenue has some of the most expensive residences in the city, with the median unit selling for tens of millions of dollars. At the time of its completion, 432 Park Avenue was the third-tallest building in the United States and the tallest residential building in the world. , it is the sixth-tallest building in the United States, the fifth-tallest building in New York City, and the third-tallest residential building in the world.

432 Park Avenue has 84 numbered stories and a mezzanine above ground. The tower's exterior is a lattice of poured-in-place concrete made from white Portland cement. The tower is segmented into 12-story blocks separated by open double-story mechanical spaces that allow wind gusts to pass through the building. It features 125 condominiums and amenities such as a private restaurant for residents. The skyscraper has received mixed reviews from both professionals and the public, with commentary about both its slenderness and its symbolism as a residence for the ultra-wealthy.

432 Park Avenue is located on the site of the former Drake Hotel, which was sold to Macklowe in 2006. The project faced delays for five years because of lack of financing as well as difficulties in acquiring the properties on the site. Construction plans were approved for 432 Park Avenue in 2011 and excavations began the next year. Sales within 432 Park Avenue were launched in 2013; the building topped out during October 2014 and was officially completed in 2015. After the building's completion, residents complained of mechanical and structural problems, leading to a lawsuit in late 2021.

Site
The building is located in the Midtown Manhattan neighborhood of New York City. It is in the middle of the block bounded by 56th Street to the south, Madison Avenue to the west, 57th Street to the north, and Park Avenue to the east. The roughly L-shaped lot encompasses . The tower is centered within the block, while its base extends east along 56th Street to Park Avenue. Nearby buildings include Park Avenue Tower to the south, 550 Madison Avenue to the southwest, 590 Madison Avenue to the west, the Fuller Building and Four Seasons Hotel New York to the north, Ritz Tower to the northeast, and 425 Park Avenue to the east.

Architecture 
432 Park Avenue was designed by Rafael Viñoly, and SLCE Architects served as the architect of record. The interiors are designed by Deborah Berke and the firm Bentel & Bentel. Other firms involved in construction included structural engineer WSP Cantor Seinuk, MEP engineer WSP Flack and Kurtz, and general contractor Lendlease. The project was developed by Harry B. Macklowe's company, Macklowe Properties.

Form and facade

432 Park Avenue has a mezzanine and 84 numbered stories. Five two-story windbreaks, spaced every 12 floors from the top, are unenclosed and serve to reduce the tower's wind load. The windbreaks contain modular mechanical services for the six floors above and below to reduce required ducting. The floor numbering system includes mechanical levels near the building's base, so the top story is numbered as floor 96.

By roof height, 432 Park is the tallest building in the city , as it surpasses the  rooftop of One World Trade Center. The building is so tall, even compared to others in New York City, that its construction required approval from Federal Aviation Administration. , 432 Park Avenue is the sixth-tallest building in the United States, the fifth-tallest building in New York City, and the third-tallest residential building in the world when topped-out buildings are included. At 15:1, the height-to-width ratio of 432 Park is one of the most slender in the world. The building's height was permitted by the city's zoning regulations partly because nearly a quarter of the building's floor area is devoted to structural and mechanical equipment, which is excluded from floor area ratio calculations. Due to its slenderness, the building has been characterized as part of a new breed of New York City "pencil towers".

The tower's exterior is a lattice of poured-in-place concrete made from white Portland cement that forms a regular grid of  apertures. Each usable floor features six  windows per face, and each double-story windbreak features twelve unglazed openings per face. The base is clad with limestone, but no additional finishes were applied to the tower. Viñoly said that the regular lattice was inspired by a 1905 trash can by Austrian designer Josef Hoffmann.

Structural features 

The core houses the elevator shafts and mechanical services. There are six elevator cabs, including service cabs; the top floors contain two elevator shafts. The tower also contains an emergency-stair shaft with two concrete stairways. To maximize occupiable space, the stairways are installed in a scissor-stair configuration, in which each stairway's flights are installed atop the other's.

To finalize the structural design prior to construction, engineers performed a dynamic analysis for stresses, deflections, and horizontal movements to revise the tower's lateral force resisting system against wind and seismic motion. When 432 Park Avenue was being designed, structural engineer Derek Kelly created a model of Midtown Manhattan to determine the wind forces that the tower would receive.

The foundation of the building contains about 60 rock anchors that descend  into the underlying bedrock, providing stability. To mitigate swaying further, the top of the tower contains two tuned mass dampers, and several additional dampers are located in the outriggers of some of the mechanical floors. The TMDs are placed between the 86th and 89th floors. Viñoly's team decided to install the TMDs after simulating the tower's projected wind forces at the Marine Institute of Memorial University of Newfoundland.

Interior

The finalized plans called for 147 apartments in total: 122 luxury condominium units of one to six bedrooms between floors 34 and 96, and 25 studio units on floors 28 and 29. The highest units, on floors 91 through 96, contain layouts that differ from those of the units on the floors below. The tower's condominium units feature -high ceilings. Macklowe initially placed thick frames on some of the windows, as he wanted to highlight the views of Central Park, but some tenants removed these frames because they took up interior space.

The building's amenities include  ceilings, golf training facilities, and private dining and screening rooms. On floor 12 is an  private restaurant with a  private terrace, which has been led by chef Shaun Hergatt . Floors 12 through 16 comprise a "club unit" with a fitness center; a swimming complex with a  pool, whirlpool, sauna, and steam room; private meeting rooms, including a 14-seat boardroom; and a library curated by Assouline Publishing. The Atlantic magazine described the screening room as having velvet armchairs and the meeting room as having mahogany paneling.

History

Macklowe acquisition and financial crisis
The 21-story, 495-room Drake Hotel had been constructed in 1926 at the corner of Park Avenue and 56th Street. In January 2006, the hotel's owner, Host Hotels & Resorts, was intending to sell the property "in the mid-$400 million range", primarily marketing the site with the prospect of replacing the aging hotel with a mixed-use skyscraper. Harry Macklowe purchased the Drake in 2006 for $418 million (equivalent to $ million in ).

Following his acquisition of the hotel, Macklowe paid French delicatessen company Fauchon $4 million to shorten the terms of their lease on the ground floor of the Drake Hotel and vacate in April 2007 instead of 2016. Shortly after the agreement was reached, Fauchon sued Macklowe in New York Supreme Court claiming that the developer was harassing the store to leave by blocking their entrance with scaffolding and threatening to cut off air conditioning and access to the hotel's bathrooms.

In April 2007, Macklowe purchased the Buccellati store at 46 East 57th Street for $47.5 million. This followed Macklowe's purchase of the Audemars Piguet store at 40 East 57th Street for $19.2 million, the Franck Muller store at 38 East 57th Street for $60 million, as well as 44 and 50 East 57th Street for $41 million. Following over 14 months of negotiations, Macklowe also had to pay Audemars Piguet $16.6 million to end their lease early and move across the street to 137 East 57th Street. The total cost of additional nearby parcels and air rights brought the acquisition cost to over $724 million and yielded a large L-shaped site between 56th and 57th Streets. In early 2007, Macklowe Properties secured a $543 million mortgage from Deutsche Bank on the site. Macklowe was said to be planning a 65-story Armani-branded tower that would consist of three stories of retail, offices until the 20th floor, topped by a 10-story hotel and 33 floors of residential space.

Additionally, Nordstrom had signed a letter of intent to open their first New York store, a  flagship, at the building's base. Macklowe had been in contract to purchase the Turnbull & Asser storefront at 42 East 57th Street for $33 million but the company's owner executed a call option in the store's lease to allow him to buy the building for $31.5 million instead. Jacob & Co's founder Jacob Arabo also demanded $100 million for the store's building at 50 East 57th Street, a price Macklowe was unable to pay. These holdouts meant Macklowe was unable to connect the other buildings he owned on East 57th Street, depriving Nordstrom of the space needed for the store's ground floor entrance. Nordstrom also reportedly required a  ceiling, which was not feasible at the site. This caused Nordstrom to back out of the deal and instead open their flagship in Central Park Tower several blocks west on 57th Street.

During the financial crisis of 2007–2008, Macklowe defaulted on the Deutsche Bank loan which was due in November 2007. In October 2007, Harry Macklowe personally repaid $156.3 million of Macklowe Property's debt on the site, bringing his personal investment in the project to over $250 million. The repayment included $38 million of mezzanine loans with a 15 percent interest rate that were held by Vornado Realty Trust. In May 2008, hotelier Kirk Kerkorian and investment company Dubai World reportedly considered purchasing the site for $200 million in addition to assuming the existing debt on the property.

The bank sued in August 2008 to begin foreclosure on the loan (which had amortized down to $482 million at the time) and take control of the development site. Deutsche Bank had divided the loan into 21 tranches and sold much of the debt to ten different investors including Highland Capital Management and Sorin Capital Management, earning tens of millions of dollars in fees. The bank retained just $12 million of the loan on its own balance sheet. During the height of the recession in November 2008, one of the investors, iStar Financial, was unable to find any buyers for its $224 million tranche of the debt for $160 million, representing just over 71 cents on the dollar. Initially, over 20 bidders were believed to be interested including Apollo Global Management, The Related Companies, and Silverstein Properties. Only a half-dozen bidders eventually offered between $100 million and roughly $130 million, or 45 and 58 cents on the dollar respectively.

Paul Manafort and CMZ Ventures

In late 2007, Joseph Sitt, founder of Thor Equities, introduced Macklowe to an investment firm named CMZ Ventures. The letters "CMZ" represented Arthur G. Cohen, a New York real estate developer; Paul Manafort, a former lobbyist, political consultant, and lawyer; and Brad Zackson, a frequent partner of Manafort and Fred Trump.

In 2008, CMZ Ventures agreed to pay $850 million for the development site which would fully pay off the Deutsche Bank loan and represent a small profit on top of Macklowe's total acquisition price. In fact, the purchase price was higher even than the appraised value of $780 million, a premium of over 10 percent which was unheard of for development site purchases. The partners wanted to build a 65-story building with a Bulgari-branded luxury hotel, condominiums, a private club, and a vertical mall. In late 2008, Dmytro Firtash, a Ukrainian natural gas oligarch and alleged associate of Russian organized crime, agreed to fund $112 million in equity and paid Manafort a deposit of $25 million. The deposit was wired from a Raiffeisen Zentralbank account that U.S. officials alleged was a front for Russian organized crime "boss of bosses" Semion Mogilevich. Manafort had met Firtash while consulting for the pro-Russia Party of Regions, at the time the ruling political party in Ukraine. French fund Inovalis also agreed to arrange another $500 million of equity for the project from various backers. Ultimately, the bid fell apart when CMZ could not arrange the necessary financing.

In 2011, the former prime minister of Ukraine, Yulia Tymoshenko, alleged in the United States District Court for the Southern District of New York that Firtash violated the Racketeer Influenced and Corrupt Organizations Act. Specifically, Tymoshenko stated that Firtash had used CMZ as a front organization for funds that he skimmed unlawfully from RosUkrEnergo, the natural gas company that he jointly controlled with Russian state-owned enterprise Gazprom. Tymoshenko also alleged that Firtash planned to use the money for political purposes, rather than as a real estate investment; specifically, she claimed that the money would go to help her opponent, Victor Yanukovych, who became Ukraine's president in 2010.

Another CMZ Ventures investor was Oleg Deripaska, a Russian oligarch and leader of the world's second-largest aluminum company Rusal, who was sanctioned by the U.S. government in 2017. Deripaska agreed to invest $56 million into 432 Park Avenue through an investment fund named Pericles which was managed by Rick Gates, a Manafort partner who has since pleaded guilty to conspiracy against the United States and making false statements in the investigation into Russian interference in the 2016 United States elections.

CIM Group investment

In January 2010, CIM Group agreed to pay $305 million for the complete development site including 434 Park Avenue and 38, 40, 44 and 50 East 57th Street while keeping Macklowe involved as a partner. The investment by CIM allowed Macklowe to repay the senior-most tranche 90 cents on the dollar while the junior-most tranches were completely wiped out. At the time, the site was considered one of New York's most valuable due to its location between East 56th and 57th Streets on the west side of Park Avenue. Citigroup's private banking arm raised an additional $415 million in equity for the project from high-net-worth individuals who invested $1 million to $5 million each. Another $100 million in equity came from CIM's existing institutional investor clients. Following the investment, CIM continued to expand the development site, purchasing 46 East 57th Street for $42.5 million in January 2011.

CIM and Macklowe were sued by Franck Muller in September 2010 after the company tried to evict the watch retailer from their space at 38 East 57th Street that Macklowe had purchased several years earlier for over $60 million. The building was master-leased to a real estate investment company, Sovereign Partners, who in turn had subleased the ground floor and mezzanine space to Franck Muller until 2018. CIM and Macklowe had purchased that master lease for $5.35 million in November 2008, making a CIM-owned company Franck Muller's new landlord. Subsequently, CIM and Macklowe had the building reappraised by Cushman & Wakefield who determined that the fair market rent for the space was $1.4 million per year, higher than the rent initially agreed to by Sovereign Partners. However, the CIM-owned company that had purchased Sovereign Partner's lease failed to pay this increased rent, leading to an event of default under the lease and allowing CIM and Macklowe to begin the eviction process. Franck Muller objected, claiming that CIM was essentially choosing not to pay itself the increased rent and manufacturing an excuse to evict the CIM-owned master lessee and in turn Franck Muller, the sublessee. In October, a New York Supreme Court ordered the case be determined through arbitration instead.

The developers received a $30 million mortgage from Pacific Northwestern Bank on the site in early April 2011. Later that month, CIM filed dummy permits for a 5-story office building in order to begin excavation work on the site and by the following month had hired Rafael Viñoly to design the new tower. Macklowe, speaking at a real estate conference in New York, claimed the building would be "monumental" and a "capstone" to his career. Previously, CIM had reportedly considered using the building's lower floors as a luxury hotel similar to nearby One57 and spoken to operators including Mandarin Oriental Hotel Group, Taj Hotels, and One&Only Resorts. The next month, CIM purchased Turnbull & Asser's storefront at 42 East 57th Street for $32.4 million and concurrently sold the nearby 50 East 57th Street to the clothier for $31.5 million, allowing CIM to expand their development site and Turnbull & Asser to remain on the same block. In December 2011, LVMH reportedly considered investing in the site for an expansion of the company's "Cheval Blanc" luxury hotel chain, creating a campus with the company's nearby LVMH Tower.

Construction

Excavation for the building's foundations began in early 2012. In March, CIM filed plans for the full building, revealing its 82-story,  height. The New York City Department of Buildings issued the construction permit two months later. By September 2012, the building's concrete foundation had been completed and the tower crane had been installed. The building passed street level by the end of the year. As construction progressed, 432 Park's developers raised asking prices for the building's units several times. By March 2013, asking prices had reached .

The project's second crane was installed in early 2012. In October 2012, the development also received $400 million in construction financing from hedge fund The Children's Investment Fund Management. The construction loan carried a low loan-to-value ratio of under 40 percent but an unusually high interest rate of over 10 percent per year. However, the loan was also nonrecourse meaning that the lender could not go after CIM or Macklowe's other assets if they defaulted on the construction loan.

Construction was temporarily halted in February 2013 after crews damaged a neighboring building and the Department of Buildings gave the project several safety violations. Though work resumed within the month, a worker was injured in an on-site construction accident that March, when a piece of wood dropped from the fifth story. In mid-2013, developers filed a revision to the plan to add another floor. This was achieved by converting floor 95, a formerly double-height story, into two separate stories of standard height.

Also in March, sales officially launched from an office at the nearby General Motors Building, with units being listed at between $20 million to $82.5 million apiece. At the time, the developers claimed more than a third of the building's units were already under contract. To assist with marketing, Macklowe spent $1 million on a four-minute film that would air exclusively in the sales center. The film, directed by Danny Forster and filmed at Silvercup Studios, follows a young woman leaving her English country house in a 1957 Rolls-Royce and taking a Learjet to her new home at 432 Park Avenue. The film also featured famed French high-wire artist Philippe Petit dangling from a helicopter, music by Cass Elliot, references to Mies van der Rohe’s Barcelona Pavilion and the Pantheon, and depictions of King Kong, Le Corbusier, Al Capone, and Anna May Wong.

432 Park Avenue passed the  mark in June 2014. The topping out ceremony was held on October 10, 2014, signifying that the building had reached its maximum height. 432 Park Avenue was nearly completed in January 2015 when work was temporarily halted again after another construction accident. In November 2015, Macklowe added a team from brokerage Douglas Elliman to supplement the developer's internal sales team tasked with selling the tower's units. By early 2016, several websites reported that 432 Park had been officially completed on December 23, 2015.

Post-opening

2010s

In June 2016, Macklowe Properties agreed to pay $411.1 million to acquire the building's retail component from CIM. Several months later, it was announced that boutique watch store Richard Mille would occupy part of the ground-floor retail space. The , two-story store opened in October 2018. At the time, Richard Mille was the only retail tenant. By the end of 2018, John Barrett also agreed to open a  salon on the building's second floor and boutique perfumery Amaffi leased  on the ground floor. Joanne Podell, broker for Cushman & Wakefield, stated in 2019 that she had to promise lower rents in order to attract retail tenants.

In 2016, Linda Macklowe filed for divorce from Harry Macklowe. As part of the divorce proceedings, she filed a lawsuit in September 2017 claiming that Harry illegally shrunk a condo on the building's 78th floor that Linda had agreed to purchase for $14.4 million. The couple initially agreed to purchase "his and hers" condominiums on the 78th floor in 2013, with Linda occupying the smaller "A" unit and Harry purchasing the larger "B" unit. The divorce court judge ordered the tower's developers to give Linda until December 21, 2017, to decide whether to purchase the downsized unit. Linda instead chose to remain at the couple's penthouse in the nearby Plaza Hotel and dropped her lawsuit over the unit's shrinkage in exchange for the return of her $2.2 million deposit. The divorce trial also revealed that Macklowe earned just $2.5 million from his investment in 432 Park Avenue and held only a $15.7 million equity stake in the retail portion of the development.

Following his subsequent marriage to Patricia Landeau, Macklowe installed a  portrait of the couple taken by Studio Harcourt on the northwest corner of the tower's retail space in March 2019. The wedding's 200-person reception took place on the building's 78th floor in a condo that was turned into a temporary ballroom. The building also hosted an event for theater director Robert Wilson's Watermill Center as part of the Park Avenue Armory's "Armory Week" of art sales in January 2018. The event, attended by Macklowe, Zac Posen, and Claude Grunitzky, was notable for employing multiple nude performers in a departure from the more classically focused events of Armory Week which centered on 18th and 19th century art.

2020s
Allegations of defects and complaints by residents were published by The New York Times in early 2021. According to the report, a leak at a mechanical floor forced two elevators out of service for several weeks in 2018. Flood damage has been reported in several apartments, and at least one would-be buyer reneged due to that issue. Other complaints have included high wind trapping a resident inside an elevator and causing "creaking, banging and clicking noises", which, according to structural engineers, are issues that have been affecting multiple supertall skyscrapers. A study commissioned by a group of residents found 73 percent of mechanical, plumbing, or electrical infrastructure in the building was not built to plans. In response, general contractor Lendlease said they had contacted CIM and Macklowe about the issues. Residents have also taken issue with the high annual costs of the private restaurant service (which rose from $1,200 per household in 2015 to $15,000 in 2020) as well as the 300 percent increase in insurance costs during a two-year period.

Due to these and other issues with the building, the condo board sued CIM Group and Macklowe Properties in September 2021. An engineer hired by the board discovered an alleged 1,500 flaws in the building. At the time of the lawsuit, only one apartment sale at the building had been finalized since the beginning of 2021, even though there were 11 vacant units. Prior to Labor Day in 2021, the entire building had to be vacated for two entire days for extensive repairs in the building's electrical system. CIM filed its answer to the lawsuit that December, claiming that the safety complaints were "vastly exaggerated".

Residents 
As early as 2012, a dozen potential clients were described as being interested in occupying units at 432 Park, and by the next year, tenants had signed contracts for over a third of the units. The following year, that proportion had risen above 50%, with all of the tenants collectively paying an estimated $1 billion. By the end of 2015, close to 90 percent of the apartments had been sold, with almost half of those owned by a foreign citizen, "part of a global elite that collects residences like art." Many of the buyers were wealthy Chinese, though there were also numerous Brazilian and Russian clients. The German newspaper Der Spiegel estimated that the majority of the units would remain unoccupied for more than ten months a year. Many buyers concealed their identities by forming limited liability companies to buy the units, and some buyers placed their apartments for sale without ever having lived there.

Notable residents include Lewis A. Sanders, Bennett LeBow, Ye Jianming, David Chu, Hely Nahmad, Jennifer Lopez, and Alex Rodriguez. Other wealthy residents include Bridgewater Associates executive Bob Prince and Douglas Elliman owner Howard Lorber.

Apartment selling prices 

In 2016, 81 of the 104 units were sold at a median price of $18.4 million; by the following year, the remaining unsold units were put for sale at prices between $6.5 and $82 million.  The first sale to be completed was that of apartment #35B, which was reported in January 2016 for $18.116 million, more than the $17.75 million asking price. Ten additional apartments were available at that time, ranging from $17.4 to $44.25 million.

The median higher-floor units were more expensive than the other units. Two units on floor 91 were sold for $60 million in 2018 to Caryl Schechter, the wife of hedge-fund manager Israel Englander, while three units on floors 92 and 93 were sold in 2017 for a combined $91 million. The 94th-floor unit was sold for $32.4 million in 2019, about 25 percent lower than the original asking price. The 95th-floor unit, originally listed for $82 million, was split in half in 2018 and the individual units were sold at $30 million. The highest unit, on floor 96, was listed at $95 million but actually sold to Saudi businessman Fawaz Alhokair for $88 million in 2016. The sale of all of the units was expected to bring in a total of $3.1 billion, the highest aggregate sales price of any building in New York City. , almost all of the units had been sold. After the structural issues at 432 Park Avenue were publicized, Alhokair placed his apartment for sale in June 2021 with an asking price of $169 million; this unit had still not been sold by the end of the next year. Conversely, one unit sold for $70 million in 2022, after the structural issues had been announced.

Critical reception

The skyscraper has received mixed reviews from both professionals and the public. 432 Park's slenderness and simplicity have been the subject of both praise and criticism. For example, Jonathan Margolis of the Financial Times said, "I have become obsessed by the almost childlike simplicity of 432 Park Ave". Aaron Betsky of Architect magazine called 432 Park "a gridded tube abstracting and punctuating the more leaden masses of the lesser boxes around it", while James Gardner of The Real Deal said that "the sense of pure geometry, the almost polemical denial of scale, only enhances the sense of immensity." Skyscraper Museum founder Carol Willis was optimistic that several Billionaires' Row buildings would become New York City designated landmarks in the 2050s, saying: "I have no doubt that some—such as 432 Park Avenue and 111 W 57 Street—will be designated as superior examples of the iconic forms characteristic of New York of the 2010s." Conversely, the architecture critic for New York magazine, Justin Davidson, wrote that the building is nothing more than "stacked cubbyhole units" and questioned the creative value of the building. The fashion consultant Tim Gunn described the building as "just a thin column. It needs a little cap." 

Some critics have cited 432 Park Avenue as a representation of New York's increasing cost of living and ostentatious wealth. A critic for the Los Angeles Times called the skyscraper an "architectural emblem of rising inequality", while New York magazine called the building's units "fancy prisons for billionaires". Bianca Bosker wrote for The Atlantic magazine that some New Yorkers had given 432 Park the nickname of "Awful Waffle", saying that New York City's supertall buildings were "an eyesore" at best and a symbol of wealth inequality at worst. 432 Park's association to wealth inequality was also remarked upon by the building's own architect, Viñoly, who commented that "There are only two markets, ultraluxury and subsidized housing." Several residents of nearby buildings said that the influx of rich residents at 432 Park Avenue would increase the worth of their own properties.

Though Viñoly and Macklowe were friends, they often insulted each other over the various perceived flaws in the design. Viñoly called Macklowe "a truck driver with an education in aesthetics", while Macklowe said that Viñoly's supertall design was motivated by "penis envy" among the city's developers, who were vying to build the tallest structures. In 2016, Viñoly reportedly joked that the design had a "couple of screw-ups", such as Macklowe's window frames, the placement of the restrooms, and Berke's interior design; he later apologized for his comments.

See also
 125 Greenwich Street
 List of tallest buildings in New York City
 List of tallest buildings in the United States
 List of tallest residential buildings

References

Notes

Citations

External links

 

2010s in Manhattan
2015 establishments in New York City
Condominiums and housing cooperatives in Manhattan
Midtown Manhattan
Park Avenue
Pencil towers in New York City
Rafael Viñoly buildings
Residential buildings completed in 2015
Residential condominiums in New York City
Residential skyscrapers in Manhattan
Skyscrapers on 57th Street (Manhattan)